Heikant is a hamlet in the municipality of Bladel, in the Dutch province of North Brabant. It is located about 3 km east of Hoogeloon.

Heikant is not a statistical entity, and the postal authorities have placed it under Hoogeloon. It has no place name signs and consists of a handful of houses.

References

Populated places in North Brabant
Bladel